Carn Euny (from ) is an archaeological site near Sancreed, on the Penwith peninsula in Cornwall, United Kingdom with considerable evidence of both Iron Age and post-Iron Age settlement. Excavations on this site have shown that there was activity at Carn Euny as early as the Neolithic period. There is evidence that shows that the first timber huts there were built about 200 BC, but by the 1st century BC, these had been replaced by stone huts. The remains of these stone huts are still visible today.

This fogou runs just below the surface of the ground and is roofed with massive stone slabs.

The site was abandoned late in the Roman period.

Location

Carn Euny lies in southwest Cornwall in the Penwith District, near the village of Sancreed. The archaeological site can be accessed at any time and the admission is free. Parking can be found in the nearby hamlet of Brane. The site is overlooked by the Iron Age hill fort of Caer Bran. Another similar Romano-British settlement is Chysauster about 10 km to the northeast. Carn Euny is managed by the Cornwall Heritage Trust.

Construction
Traces of human activity in Carn Euny have been detected from the early Neolithic period. The first settlement of wooden huts was around 200 BC. In the 1st century BC these were replaced by stone huts, the remains of which are still visible. At this time, the people of Carn Euny lived from agriculture, livestock, trade, and perhaps tin mining. The houses were of a type with enclosed courtyards. The most important structure of the site is certainly the fogou (Cornish for cave), a man-made underground passage which is covered with massive stone slabs. Fogous can be found in other places in the UK and Ireland, and are known more generally as souterrains. Their purpose is unclear. The fogou of Carn Euny is in particularly good condition and consists of a 20 m long corridor, with a side passage that leads to a round stone chamber with a collapsed roof, and a small tunnel which may be a second entrance.

Excavations

The site was discovered in the early 19th Century by prospectors searching for tin deposits. Between 1863 and 1868, the antiquarian William Copeland Borlase examined the archaeological site and exposed the fogou. The graphic artist John Thomas Blight made corresponding engravings for the excavation report. During the 1920s, Dr. Favell and Canon Taylor discovered the foundation walls of the houses with courtyards. Between 1964 and 1972, extensive excavations were carried out, in which nine hut foundations were discovered. The fogou and the circular chamber were investigated and restored. Four main occupation phases between the 5th century BC and the 4th century AD were found.

Chapel Euny Well
West of the settlement are a pair of ancient wells. One is mentioned in The Legendary Lore of the Holy Wells of England of 1893 where William Borlase states (writing in the 1750s):"I happened luckily to be at this well upon the last day of the year, on which, according to vulgar opinion, it exerts its principal and most salutary powers. Two women were here, who came from a neighbouring parish, and were busily employed in bathing a child. They both assured me that people who had a mind to receive any benefit from St. Euny's Well must come and wash upon the three first Wednesdays in May. Children suffering from mesenteric disease should be dipped three times in Chapel Uny widderschynnes, and widderschynnes dragged three times round the well." It is also referred to as St. Eurinus' or Uny's Well and may be confused with Saint Euny's Well at Carn Brea.

See also

Chysauster
Petrosomatoglyph Symbolism
Ringfort

References

External links 

  History on Carn Euny: English Heritage
Digital tour of the Carn Euny fogou

Buildings and structures in Cornwall
History of Cornwall
Iron Age sites in Cornwall
Prehistoric sites in Cornwall
English Heritage sites in Cornwall
Cornish courtyard houses
Fogous